This is a list of Live with Regis and Kelly episodes which were broadcast during the show's 22nd season.  The list is ordered by air date.

Although the co-hosts may have read a couple of emails during the broadcast, it does not necessarily count as a "Regis and Kelly Inbox" segment.

September 2009

October 2009

November 2009

December 2009

January 2010

February 2010

March 2010

April 2010

May 2010

June 2010

July 2010

August 2010

See also
Live with Regis and Kelly (season 18)
Live with Regis and Kelly (season 19)
Live with Regis and Kelly (season 20)
Live with Regis and Kelly (season 21)

References

2009 American television seasons
2010 American television seasons